Men With No Shadows (Traditional Chinese: 不速之約), is a Hong Kong television drama starring Bobby Au-yeung, Raymond Lam, and Tavia Yeung. Produced by Poon Ka Tak  Men With No Shadows is a TVB production.

Cast

Kong Family

Fong Family

Toi Family

Tong Family

Sung Family

Hong Zhi Pharmaceutical

Other casts

Awards and nominations

45th TVB Anniversary Awards 2011
 Won: Most Improved Actress (Sire Ma)
 Nominated: Best Drama
 Nominated: Best Actor (Bobby Au Yeung)
 Nominated: Best Actor (Raymond Lam)
 Nominated: Best Supporting Actor (Power Chan)
 Nominated: Most Improved Actress (Mandy Wong)

My Astro On Demand Favourites Awards 2011
 Won: My Favourite Television Character (Raymond Lam)
 Nominated: My Favourite Drama Top 5
 Nominated: My Favourite Actor (Raymond Lam) Top 5
 Nominated: My Favourite Supporting Actress (Gigi Wong)
 Nominated: My Favourite Theme Song (Raymond Lam) Top 5
 Nominated: My Favourite Television Character (Bobby Au-yeung)

Viewership ratings

The highest rating per minute.

References

External links
Official Website
K-TVB.net

TVB dramas
2011 Hong Kong television series debuts
2011 Hong Kong television series endings